The 2019–20 NIFL Premiership (known as the Danske Bank Premiership for sponsorship reasons) was the 12th season of Northern Ireland's highest national football league in this format since its inception in 2008, the 119th season of Irish league football overall, and the seventh season that the league operated as part of the Northern Ireland Football League. The fixtures were released on 26 June 2019. The season began on 9 August 2019 and was initially scheduled to conclude on 25 April 2020, with the promotion/relegation play-off scheduled to take place in the first week of May 2020. However, the season was suspended on 13 March 2020 as a result of the COVID-19 pandemic in Northern Ireland, with the clubs having only played 31 of the 38 rounds of fixtures. The season did not resume after the suspension, with the final games having been played on 7 March 2020.

The Irish FA initially suspended all football-related activity in Northern Ireland until 4 April, with this suspension subsequently being extended first until 30 April, and then until 31 May. On 9 June, NIFL gave clubs the opportunity to vote on two options to conclude the remainder of the season, both of which were rejected by a majority of clubs. The first option was playing two more rounds of fixtures behind closed doors and curtailing the league season after 33 games. This would have meant that every club had played every other club three times. The second option was to curtail the season immediately, and use a mathematical formula chosen by an independent panel to calculate the final standings. On 23 June 2020, after talks between the clubs had failed to find a consensus on an alternative option, NIFL announced that the season was over, and that a mathematical formula would be used to determine the final league standings.

Linfield were the defending champions, having lifted the league title for a record 53rd time the previous season. They successfully defended the title to win a record 54th league championship, after NIFL announced that the final league standings would be decided by a points per game average. Every team had played 31 games, so the application of points per game was academic, and there were no changes to the standings. This meant that Linfield equalled the world record for the most league titles won by any club, a record now shared with Scottish club Rangers. The promotion/relegation play-off was cancelled, meaning 11th-placed Warrenpoint Town were reprieved. However, automatic relegation still took place, meaning Institute faced the drop back into the NIFL Championship. On 29 June 2020, the club lodged an appeal with the Irish FA against their relegation. However, the appeal was rejected by the IFA, and the club decided not to pursue the matter any further.

Linfield qualified for the 2020–21 UEFA Champions League preliminary round, while runners-up Coleraine and 2019–20 Irish Cup winners Glentoran qualified for the 2020–21 UEFA Europa League preliminary round.

Teams

Twelve teams competed in the 2019–20 NIFL Premiership, ten of which had retained their Premiership status from the previous season. The previous season's bottom Premiership club, Newry City, were relegated to the 2019–20 NIFL Championship after only one season in the top flight, and were replaced by Larne, who were promoted to the Premiership as 2018–19 NIFL Championship winners. This marked a return to the top flight for the first time in 11 years for Larne, after they were relegated at the end of the 2007–08 season when they did not apply for a place in the Premiership for the 2008–09 season.

The previous season's 11th-placed Premiership team, Ards, faced 2018–19 NIFL Championship runners-up, Carrick Rangers, in a two-legged promotion/relegation play-off. Carrick Rangers won the tie 3–1 on aggregate to secure promotion to this season's Premiership, with Ards relegated to replace them in the Championship. This brought an end to Ards' three-season stay in the top flight, and meant an immediate return to the Premiership for Carrick Rangers after only one season in the Championship.

Stadia and locations

League table

Results

Matches 1–22
During matches 1–22 each team will play every other team twice (home and away).

Matches 23–31
During matches 23–33 each team was scheduled to play every other team for the third time (either at home, or away). However, two rounds of fixtures did not take place, after the league season was curtailed as a result of the COVID-19 pandemic.

NIFL Premiership play-off
The eleventh-placed Premiership team usually played the Championship runners-up over two legs for one spot in the following season's NIFL Premiership, with the Premiership team given home advantage for the second leg. However, the play-off was cancelled when the league was curtailed due to the COVID-19 pandemic.

Top goalscorers

References

External links

NIFL Premiership seasons
Northern Ireland
2019–20 in Northern Ireland association football
Northern Ireland